Retreat of the state, advance of the private sector, or state retreats and people advance, known in Chinese as "guotui minjin", also called as renationalization, is an economic term referring to the phenomenon of private companies moving forward as state-owned enterprises retreat from economic life. In the Chinese context, the notion specifically means the policy of privatization of state-owned enterprises and the issues it raises during the reform and opening-up process in China. It is a frequently mentioned phenomenon in the Chinese economic growth cycle that started in 2002.

In 1998, the Chinese government comprehensively launched the policy of "guotui minjin", allowing state-owned capital to withdraw from competitive industries and private enterprises to enter. Since the reform and opening up, China has swung between state socialism and state capitalism, and into the 21st century, it was gradually replaced by "the state advances, the private sector retreats".

After 1978, the first landmark event of the phenomenon of "guotui minjin" in China was the "Tieben Incident" that occurred in 2004. From 2008 to 2009, it reached a climax. The merger and reorganization of coal mining enterprises in Shanxi and the merger of Rizhao Iron and Steel by Shandong Iron and Steel Group were the landmark events.

References 

Economic reforms
Economic liberalization
Chinese economic policy